Blackhawk Island is an unincorporated community located in the towns of Koshkonong and Sumner, Jefferson County, Wisconsin, United States. Its best known longtime resident was the poet, Lorine Niedecker.

Notes

Unincorporated communities in Jefferson County, Wisconsin
Unincorporated communities in Wisconsin